Canhas is a civil parish in the municipality of Ponta do Sol in the Portuguese archipelago of Madeira. Extending into the interior from the coast, the parish has an area of  16.66 km2. It has a population of 3,769 (2011).

Economy
A once essentially agricultural parish, Canhas has gradually been converted into an important economic centre, while retaining its rural feel.  Even though agriculture is still a prime industry, civil construction and related industries have conquered a prominent position in the parish.

References

Freguesias of Ponta do Sol, Madeira